Psyzh is a rural locality (an aul) in Abazinsky District of the Karachay-Cherkess Republic, Russia. Population:

Demographics
In 2002, the population mainly comprised the following ethnic groups:
Abazins: 79.2%
Cherkess: 8.6%
Russians: 7.3%
Karachays: 1.5%
Nogais: 0.6%
Others: 2.8%

References

Rural localities in Karachay-Cherkessia